ECA International provides data, software services, consultancy and training to help companies manage compensation and benefits for international workers moving around the world on a short-term, long-term or permanent basis.

The company offers data on cost of living, salary, accommodation, tax, labour law, benefits and quality of life for international assignees in over 480 locations worldwide. Clients can subscribe to services including country reports and allowance calculators, or they can request ad hoc consultancy projects including global mobility policy design and review.

The company runs surveys throughout the year to enable clients to benchmark their management policy for expatriate employees. It also runs regular IHR (International Human Resources) events and training sessions including its International HR Practitioner course.

ECAEnterprise is an assignment management system.

History
ECA International was founded by a group of international companies in 1971, in order to simplify the exchange of information for the management of expatriates. ECA, which stands for Employment Conditions Abroad International, has offices in London, New York City, Sydney and Hong Kong.

References

External links

Expatica HR
Le Monde article on most expensive locations for expatriates

International business organizations
Companies based in the London Borough of Camden